Adir or ADIR may refer to:

 Air Data Inertial Reference Unit (ADIRU), a key component of the Air Data Inertial Reference System (ADIRS), which supplies air data and inertial reference information to aircraft systems
 Adir, meaning "Strong One," one of the names of God in Judaism
 Adir Hu, a hymn sung by Jews worldwide at the Passover Seder
 Autism Diagnostic Interview-Revised, a structured interview conducted with the parents of individuals who have been referred for the evaluation of possible autism or autism spectrum disorders

People

 Ilana Adir (born 1941), Israeli Olympic sprinter
 Adir Ascalon, surrealist painter and sculptor, son of Maurice Ascalon
 Adir Maman (born 1991), Israeli footballer
 Adir Miller (born 1974), Israeli actor and comedian
 Adir Zik (1939-2005), Israeli television producer and journalist

Arabic masculine given names